June Park is a census-designated place (CDP) in Brevard County, Florida. The population was 4,094 at the 2010 United States Census. It is part of the Palm Bay–Melbourne–Titusville Metropolitan Statistical Area.

Geography
June Park is located at  (28.073643, -80.685709).

Demographics

As of the census in 2000, there were 4,367 people, 1,736 households, and 1,274 families residing in the CDP. The racial makeup of the CDP was 96.86% White, 0.76% African American, 0.16% Native American, 1.21% Asian, 0.14% from other races, and 0.87% from two or more races. Hispanic or Latino of any race were 2.29% of the population.

There were 1,736 households, out of which 27.1% had children under the age of 18 living with them, 61.8% were married couples living together, 7.6% had a female householder with no husband present, and 26.6% were non-families. 20.7% of all households were made up of individuals, and 8.5% had someone living alone who was 65 years of age or older.  The average household size was 2.51 and the average family size was 2.89.

In the CDP, the population was spread out, with 21.2% under the age of 18, 6.2% from 18 to 24, 26.2% from 25 to 44, 28.0% from 45 to 64, and 18.3% who were 65 years of age or older.  The median age was 43 years. For every 100 females, there were 99.8 males. For every 100 females age 18 and over, there were 100.7 males.

The median income for a household in the CDP was $43,670, while the median income for a family was $49,926. Males had a median income of $39,821 versus $26,386 for females. The per capita income for the CDP was $24,147. About 4.2% of families and 4.9% of the population were below the poverty line, including 6.9% of those under age 18 and 5.3% of those age 65 or over.

References

Census-designated places in Brevard County, Florida
Census-designated places in Florida